Flynn is a surname of Irish origin. It may also refer to:

Entertainment
 Flynn (film), a 1997 Australian film about Errol Flynn
 Flynn Adam Atkins (also known as FLYNN), rapper and member of hip hop group LA Symphony
 An NPC character in Skylanders: Spyro's Adventure
 Bridget Flynn, a fictional comic book superheroine who goes by the name Supervision

Places
 Flynn, Australian Capital Territory, a suburb in the Canberra district of Belconnen
 The Division of Flynn, an Australian Electoral Division in the state of Queensland
 Flynn, Northern Territory, Australia
 Flynn, a rural locality near Rosedale, Australia
 Flynn Township, Michigan, US
 Flynn, Oregon, US
 Flynn, Texas, US

Given name

People
 Flynn Adam Atkins, American producer, singer, and rapper
 Flynn Appleby, Australian rules footballer
 Flynn Berry, American author
 Flynn Downes, professional English footballer
 Flynn Gower, Australian vocalist, composer, and guitarist

Fictional characters 
 Flynn Carroll, from the Syfy TV series Hunter, played by Nathan Phillips
 Flynn Carsen, from The Librarian movies, played by Noah Wyle
 Flynn Jones, CeCe's younger brother from the TV show Shake It Up, played by Davis Cleveland
 Flynn Rider, male protagonist of the film Tangled
 Flynn, a character from Thomas & Friends
 Walter "Flynn" White Jr., from the TV series Breaking Bad
 Flynn, a character from Netflix's Julie and the Phantoms.

Other
 Flynn's taxonomy, a system for classifying computer architectures
 The Flynn effect, the gradual rise in IQ test scores

See also
Flinn (disambiguation)

English masculine given names
Unisex given names